Muyippoth is the name of place, it is included in Cheruvannur Grama Panchayath, Koyilandy Thaluk. Forty percent of this area is paddy land. It is situated near the Kuttiady river. The settlements of Vadakara and Perambra are joining through it.

Temples
The Shree Shala Temple and Parakkool Masijid are the famous religious places. Chaniyam bridge connects Muyippoth to Vatakara.

Puthukkidiyidathil sree muthaasiyamma devi temple.

Transportation
Muyipoth connects to other parts of India through Koyilandy town.  The nearest airports are at Kannur and Kozhikode.  The nearest railway station is at Vadakara.  The national highway no.66 passes through Koyilandy and the northern stretch connects to Mangalore, Goa and Mumbai.  The southern stretch connects to Cochin and Trivandrum.  The eastern National Highway No.54 going through Kuttiady connects to Mananthavady, Mysore and Bangalore.

References

Koyilandy area
Villages in Kozhikode district
Populated waterside places in India